K. Ananda Nambiar (1918 – 11 October 1991) was an Indian politician of the Communist Party of India who served as a member of the Lok Sabha from Mayiladuthurai and Tiruchirapalli. He was the first communist to be elected to a State Legislature.

Politics 

In 1946, Nambiar stood for election to the Madras Legislative Assembly as a candidate of the Communist Party of India and was elected. He served as a member of the Madras Legislative Assembly from 1946 to 1951. He participated in the 1951 Lok Sabha elections as a candidate from Mayiladuthurai and was elected. He served as the Member of Parliament for Mayiladuthurai or Mayuram from 1951 to 1957 and Tiruchirapalli from 1962 to 1971.

Death 

Nambiar died on 11 October 1991 at Tiruchirapalli after a heart attack.

References

 Obituary Reference in Parliament of India website

1918 births
1991 deaths
Lok Sabha members from Tamil Nadu
India MPs 1962–1967
India MPs 1967–1970
India MPs 1952–1957
People from Tiruchirappalli district
Communist Party of India politicians from Tamil Nadu